Gustav Küjen (13 January 1871 Peetri Parish, Järva County – 17 August 1920 Tallinn) was an Estonian politician. He was a member of Estonian Constituent Assembly. He was a member of the assembly since 24 April 1920. He replaced Robert Astrem. About 18 August 1920, he resigned his position and he was replaced by Johannes Põllupüü.

References

1871 births
1920 deaths
Members of the Estonian Constituent Assembly